Naturally occurring manganese (25Mn) is composed of one stable isotope, 55Mn. 26 radioisotopes have been characterized, with the most stable being 53Mn with a half-life of 3.7 million years, 54Mn with a half-life of 312.3 days, and 52Mn with a half-life of 5.591 days. All of the remaining radioactive isotopes have half-lives that are less than 3 hours and the majority of these have half-lives that are less than a minute. This element also has 3 meta states.

Manganese is part of the iron group of elements, which are thought to be synthesized in large stars shortly before supernova explosions. 53Mn decays to 53Cr with a half-life of 3.7 million years. Because of its relatively short half-life, 53Mn occurs only in tiny amounts due to the action of cosmic rays on iron in rocks. Manganese isotopic contents are typically combined with chromium isotopic contents and have found application in isotope geology and radiometric dating. Mn−Cr isotopic ratios reinforce the evidence from 26Al and 107Pd for the early history of the Solar System. Variations in 53Cr/52Cr and Mn/Cr ratios from several meteorites indicate an initial 53Mn/55Mn ratio that suggests Mn−Cr isotopic systematics must result from in-situ decay of 53Mn in differentiated planetary bodies. Hence 53Mn provides additional evidence for nucleosynthetic processes immediately before coalescence of the Solar System.

The isotopes of manganese range in atomic weight from 46 u (46Mn) to 72 u (72Mn). The primary decay mode before the most abundant stable isotope, 55Mn, is electron capture and the primary mode after is beta decay.

List of isotopes 

|-
| rowspan=4|46Mn
| rowspan=4 style="text-align:right" | 25
| rowspan=4 style="text-align:right" | 21
| rowspan=4|45.98672(12)#
| rowspan=4|37(3) ms
| β+ (78%)
| 46Cr
| rowspan=4|(4+)
| rowspan=4|
| rowspan=4|
|-
| β+, p (22%)
| 45V
|-
| β+, α (<1%)
| 42Ti
|-
| β+, 2p (<1%)
| 44Ti
|-
| style="text-indent:1em" | 46mMn
| colspan="3" style="text-indent:2em" | 150(100)# keV
| 1# ms
| β+
| 46Cr
| 1-#
|
|
|-
| rowspan=2|47Mn
| rowspan=2 style="text-align:right" | 25
| rowspan=2 style="text-align:right" | 22
| rowspan=2|46.97610(17)#
| rowspan=2|100(50) ms
| β+ (96.6%)
| 47Cr
| rowspan=2|5/2−#
| rowspan=2|
| rowspan=2|
|-
| β+, p (3.4%)
| 46V
|-
| rowspan=3|48Mn
| rowspan=3 style="text-align:right" | 25
| rowspan=3 style="text-align:right" | 23
| rowspan=3|47.96852(12)
| rowspan=3|158.1(22) ms
| β+ (99.71%)
| 48Cr
| rowspan=3|4+
| rowspan=3|
| rowspan=3|
|-
| β+, p (.027%)
| 47V
|-
| β+, α (6×10−4%)
| 44Ti
|-
| 49Mn
| style="text-align:right" | 25
| style="text-align:right" | 24
| 48.959618(26)
| 382(7) ms
| β+
| 49Cr
| 5/2−
|
|
|-
| 50Mn
| style="text-align:right" | 25
| style="text-align:right" | 25
| 49.9542382(11)
| 283.29(8) ms
| β+
| 50Cr
| 0+
|
|
|-
| style="text-indent:1em" | 50mMn
| colspan="3" style="text-indent:2em" | 229(7) keV
| 1.75(3) min
| β+
| 50Cr
| 5+
|
|
|-
| 51Mn
| style="text-align:right" | 25
| style="text-align:right" | 26
| 50.9482108(11)
| 46.2(1) min
| β+
| 51Cr
| 5/2−
|
|
|-
| 52Mn
| style="text-align:right" | 25
| style="text-align:right" | 27
| 51.9455655(21)
| 5.591(3) d
| β+
| 52Cr
| 6+
|
|
|-
| rowspan=2 style="text-indent:1em" | 52mMn
| rowspan=2 colspan="3" style="text-indent:2em" | 377.749(5) keV
| rowspan=2|21.1(2) min
| β+ (98.25%)
| 52Cr
| rowspan=2|2+
| rowspan=2|
| rowspan=2|
|-
| IT (1.75%)
| 52Mn
|-
| 53Mn
| style="text-align:right" | 25
| style="text-align:right" | 28
| 52.9412901(9)
| 3.7(4)×106 y
| EC
| 53Cr
| 7/2−
| trace
|
|-
| rowspan=3|54Mn
| rowspan=3 style="text-align:right" | 25
| rowspan=3 style="text-align:right" | 29
| rowspan=3|53.9403589(14)
| rowspan=3|312.03(3) d
| EC 99.99%
| 54Cr
| rowspan=3|3+
| rowspan=3|
| rowspan=3|
|-
| β− (2.9×10−4%)
| 54Fe
|-
| β+ (5.76×10−7%)
| 54Cr
|-
| 55Mn
| style="text-align:right" | 25
| style="text-align:right" | 30
| 54.9380451(7)
| colspan=3 align=center|Stable
| 5/2−
| 1.0000
|
|-
| 56Mn
| style="text-align:right" | 25
| style="text-align:right" | 31
| 55.9389049(7)
| 2.5789(1) h
| β−
| 56Fe
| 3+
|
|
|-
| 57Mn
| style="text-align:right" | 25
| style="text-align:right" | 32
| 56.9382854(20)
| 85.4(18) s
| β−
| 57Fe
| 5/2−
|
|
|-
| 58Mn
| style="text-align:right" | 25
| style="text-align:right" | 33
| 57.93998(3)
| 3.0(1) s
| β−
| 58Fe
| 1+
|
|
|-
| rowspan=2 style="text-indent:1em" | 58mMn
| rowspan=2 colspan="3" style="text-indent:2em" | 71.78(5) keV
| rowspan=2|65.2(5) s
| β− (>99.9%)
| 58Fe
| rowspan=2|(4)+
| rowspan=2|
| rowspan=2|
|-
| IT (<.1%)
| 58Mn
|-
| 59Mn
| style="text-align:right" | 25
| style="text-align:right" | 34
| 58.94044(3)
| 4.59(5) s
| β−
| 59Fe
| (5/2)−
|
|
|-
| 60Mn
| style="text-align:right" | 25
| style="text-align:right" | 35
| 59.94291(9)
| 51(6) s
| β−
| 60Fe
| 0+
|
|
|-
| rowspan=2 style="text-indent:1em" | 60mMn
| rowspan=2 colspan="3" style="text-indent:2em" | 271.90(10) keV
| rowspan=2|1.77(2) s
| β− (88.5%)
| 60Fe
| rowspan=2|3+
| rowspan=2|
| rowspan=2|
|-
| IT (11.5%)
| 60Mn
|-
| 61Mn
| style="text-align:right" | 25
| style="text-align:right" | 36
| 60.94465(24)
| 0.67(4) s
| β−
| 61Fe
| (5/2)−
|
|
|-
| rowspan=2|62Mn
| rowspan=2 style="text-align:right" | 25
| rowspan=2 style="text-align:right" | 37
| rowspan=2|61.94843(24)
| rowspan=2|671(5) ms
| β− (>99.9%)
| 62Fe
| rowspan=2|(3+)
| rowspan=2|
| rowspan=2|
|-
| β−, n (<.1%)
| 61Fe
|-
| style="text-indent:1em" | 62mMn
| colspan="3" style="text-indent:2em" | 0(150)# keV
| 92(13) ms
|
|
| (1+)
|
|
|-
| 63Mn
| style="text-align:right" | 25
| style="text-align:right" | 38
| 62.95024(28)
| 275(4) ms
| β−
| 63Fe
| 5/2−#
| 
| 
|-
| rowspan=2|64Mn
| rowspan=2 style="text-align:right" | 25
| rowspan=2 style="text-align:right" | 39
| rowspan=2|63.95425(29)
| rowspan=2|88.8(25) ms
| β− (>99.9%)
| 64Fe
| rowspan=2|(1+)
| rowspan=2|
| rowspan=2|
|-
| β−, n (<.1%)
| 63Fe
|-
| style="text-indent:1em" | 64mMn
| colspan="3" style="text-indent:2em" | 135(3) keV
| >100 µs
|
|
|
|
|
|-
| rowspan=2|65Mn
| rowspan=2 style="text-align:right" | 25
| rowspan=2 style="text-align:right" | 40
| rowspan=2|64.95634(58)
| rowspan=2|92(1) ms
| β− (>99.9%)
| 65Fe
| rowspan=2|5/2−#
| rowspan=2|
| rowspan=2|
|-
| β−, n (<.1%)
| 64Fe
|-
| rowspan=2|66Mn
| rowspan=2 style="text-align:right" | 25
| rowspan=2 style="text-align:right" | 41
| rowspan=2|65.96108(43)#
| rowspan=2|64.4(18) ms
| β− (>99.9%)
| 66Fe
| rowspan=2|
| rowspan=2|
| rowspan=2|
|-
| β−, n (<.1%)
| 65Fe
|-
| 67Mn
| style="text-align:right" | 25
| style="text-align:right" | 42
| 66.96414(54)#
| 45(3) ms
| β−
| 67Fe
| 5/2−#
| 
|
|-
| 68Mn
| style="text-align:right" | 25
| style="text-align:right" | 43
| 67.96930(64)#
| 28(4) ms
|
|
|
|
|
|-
| 69Mn
| style="text-align:right" | 25
| style="text-align:right" | 44
| 68.97284(86)#
| 14(4) ms
|
|
| 5/2−#
|
|
|-
| rowspan=3|70Mn
| rowspan=3 style="text-align:right" | 25
| rowspan=3 style="text-align:right" | 45
| rowspan=3|69.978050(540)#
| rowspan=3|19.9(17) ms
| β−=?
| 70Fe
| rowspan=3| (4,5)
| rowspan=3|
| rowspan=3|
|-
| β−, n?
| 69Fe
|-
| β−, 2n?
| 68Fe
|-
| rowspan=3|71Mn
| rowspan=3 style="text-align:right" | 25
| rowspan=3 style="text-align:right" | 46
| rowspan=3|70.982160(540)#
| rowspan=3|16# ms (>400 ns)
| β−?
| 71Fe
| rowspan=3| 5/2-#
| rowspan=3|
| rowspan=3|
|-
| β−, n?
| 70Fe
|-
| β−, 2n?
| 69Fe
|-
| rowspan=3|72Mn
| rowspan=3 style="text-align:right" | 25
| rowspan=3 style="text-align:right" | 47
| rowspan=3|71.988010(640)#
| rowspan=3|12# ms (>620 ns)
| β−?
| 72Fe
| rowspan=3| 
| rowspan=3|
| rowspan=3|
|-
| β−, n?
| 71Fe
|-
| β−, 2n?
| 70Fe
|-
| 73Mn
| style="text-align:right" | 25
| style="text-align:right" | 48
| 72.992810(640)#
| 12# ms (>410 ns)
| β−?
| 73Fe
| 5/2−#
|
|

References 

 Isotope masses from:

 Isotopic compositions and standard atomic masses from:

 Half-life, spin, and isomer data selected from the following sources.

 
Manganese
Manganese